Fred Allen Berry (March 19, 1951 – October 21, 2003) was an American actor and street dancer. He was best known for his role as Freddie "Rerun" Stubbs on the 1970s television show What's Happening!!

Career
Berry was born on March 19, 1951, in St. Louis, Missouri, and grew up in an inner-city housing estate. He had aspirations of becoming a successful dancer and actor as a child. Early in his career, Berry was a member of the Los Angeles-based dance troupe The Lockers, with whom he appeared on the third episode of Saturday Night Live in 1975. He additionally appeared on the dance music show Soul Train, and was featured in the program's signature line dance segment doing the memorable early 1970s dance step "the slo-mo".

Berry achieved more widespread fame playing the character Freddie "Rerun" Stubbs on the ABC sitcom What's Happening!!, which aired from 1976 to 1979 as he was in his mid 20s. The role was originally going to be given by that of a skinny and white actor. His earned Rerun sobriquet was chosen because the character had to continuously repeat all of his classes during summer school. He became one of the show's top characters with a trademark red beret, suspenders, and the dance moves he previously used during his time with The Lockers. In 1985, Berry returned to reprise his role as Rerun in the series What's Happening Now!!. He was fired before the first season ended due to a salary dispute, when he requested that he receive more money than the rest of the cast.

Berry struggled with drug and alcohol issues throughout the span of his career and life. In 1996, he told People magazine “I was a millionaire by the time I was 29, but then the stress of success got to me. The fat jokes got to me. And I got heavily into drugs and alcohol.” In a 1996 interview, he said that he had been experimenting with drugs and alcohol since he was a teenager, but as he became more successful, he could afford more drugs. Berry had attempted suicide three times, but later recovered and spent his time visiting many churches.

During the 1990s, Berry became a motivational speaker and Baptist minister, and lost 100 lbs after being diagnosed with type 2 diabetes.

Personal life and death
Berry was married six times to four different women, the first two of whom he married twice each. He has three children: DeShannon, Portia and Freddy, who works as Fred Berry Jr.

On October 21, 2003, Berry was found dead at his Los Angeles home, where he was recovering from a stroke. The cause of death was listed as natural causes. He is interred at Forest Lawn Memorial Park in the Hollywood Hills of Los Angeles.

Filmography
Hammer (1972) – Dancer (uncredited)
What's Happening!! (1976-1979) – Freddie "Rerun" Stubbs 
The Brady Bunch Variety Hour (1977) – Rerun (one episode)
Vice Squad (1982) – Sugar Pimp Dorsey
A Stroke of Genius (1984)
Alice (1984) – Bobo (one episode)
What's Happening Now!! (1985-1986) – Freddie "Rerun" Stubbs 
Martin (1993) – Himself (one episode)
In the Hood (1998) – Uncle Paul
Big Money Hustlas (2000) – Bootleg Greg
Bum Runner (2002) – Can Man (short film)
Scrubs (2003) – Himself (one episode)
Dickie Roberts: Former Child Star (2003) – Himself
In the Land of Merry Misfits (2007) – Himself

Other selected appearances
Battle of the Network Stars III (1977) – Himself 
"I Wonder Who She's Seeing Now" by The Temptations (1988) – Club Patron (music video)
The Howard Stern Show (1992) – Himself (one episode)
In Living Color (1993) – Himself (one episode) 
Murder Was the Case: The Movie (1995) – Rerun (music video short)
The Freshest Kids: A History of the B-Boy (2001) – Himself
I Love the '70s (2003) – Himself (one episode)

References

External links

 
 
 Lockerlegends.net Fred Berry

1951 births
2003 deaths
African-American Baptist ministers
American male television actors
20th-century American male actors
Male actors from St. Louis
Male actors from Los Angeles
African-American male actors
Burials at Forest Lawn Memorial Park (Hollywood Hills)
People with type 2 diabetes
20th-century African-American people
21st-century African-American people
20th-century Baptist ministers from the United States